Zoia Ceaușescu (28 February 1949 – 20 November 2006) was a Romanian mathematician, the daughter of Communist leader Nicolae Ceaușescu and his wife, Elena. She was also known as Tovarășa Zoia (comrade Zoia).

Biography

Zoia Ceaușescu studied at High School nr. 24 (now Jean Monnet High School) in Bucharest and graduated in 1966. She then continued her studies at the Faculty of Mathematics, University of Bucharest. She received her Ph.D. in 1977 with thesis On Intertwining Dilations written under the direction of Ciprian Foias. Ceaușescu then worked as a researcher at the Institute of Mathematics of the Romanian Academy in Bucharest. Her field of specialization was functional analysis. Allegedly, her parents were unhappy with their daughter's choice of doing research in mathematics, so the Institute was disbanded in 1975. She moved on to work for Institutul pentru Creație Științifică și Tehnică (INCREST, Institute for Scientific and Technical Creativity), where she eventually started and headed a new department of mathematics. In 1976, Ceaușescu received the Simion Stoilow Prize for her outstanding contributions to the mathematical sciences.

She was married in 1980 to Mircea Oprean, an engineer and professor at the Polytechnic University of Bucharest.

During the Romanian Revolution, on 24 December 1989, she was arrested for "undermining the Romanian economy" and was released only eight months later, on 18 August 1990. After she was freed, she tried unsuccessfully to return to her former job at INCREST, then gave up and retired. After the revolution, some newspapers reported that she had lived a wild life, having plenty of lovers and often being drunk.

After her parents were executed, the new government confiscated the house where she and her husband lived (the house was used as proof of allegedly stolen wealth), so she had to live with friends.

After the revolution that ousted her parents, Zoia reported that during her parents' time in power her mother had asked the Securitate to keep an eye on the Ceaușescu children, perhaps she felt, out of a "sense of love".  The Securitate "could not touch" the children she said, but the information they provided created a lot of problems for the children.  She also remarked that power had a "destructive effect" on her father and that he "lost his sense of judgement".

Zoia Ceaușescu believed that her parents were not buried in Ghencea Cemetery; she attempted to have their remains exhumed, but a military court refused her request.

Zoia was a chain smoker. She died of lung cancer in 2006, at age 57.

Selected publications
Zoia Ceaușescu published 22 scientific papers between 1976 and 1988. Some of those are:

References

Zoia Ceausescu
Daughters of national leaders
20th-century Romanian mathematicians
Mathematical analysts
People of the Romanian Revolution
University of Bucharest alumni
Deaths from lung cancer in Romania
1949 births
2006 deaths
20th-century women scientists
20th-century women mathematicians
Scientists from Bucharest